Leah Landrum Taylor (born August 23, 1966) is a Democratic politician. She was in the Arizona legislature for sixteen years, first in the House of Representatives from 1999 through 2007, then in the Senate from 2007 to 2015. She represented the 23rd, 16th, and 27th districts; the lines were redrawn at the beginning of each decade. Landrum Taylor was the Senate minority leader from January to October 2013. During her final term, Landrum Taylor was the only African-American in the Legislature.

She is a member of Sigma Gamma Rho sorority.

References

External links

 Senator Leah Landrum Taylor – District 16 official State Senate website
 Profile at Project Vote Smart
 Follow the Money – Leah Landrum Taylor
 2008 2006 State Senate campaign contributions
 2004 2002 2000 1998 1996 State House campaign contributions

1966 births
Living people
Democratic Party Arizona state senators
Democratic Party members of the Arizona House of Representatives
Women state legislators in Arizona
Arizona State University alumni
African-American women in politics
Politicians from Phoenix, Arizona
African-American state legislators in Arizona
21st-century African-American people
21st-century African-American women
20th-century African-American people
20th-century African-American women